Clausthalite is a lead selenide mineral, PbSe. It forms a solid solution series with galena PbS.

Occurrence
It occurs in low-sulfur hydrothermal deposits with other selenides and in mercury deposits. It is associated with tiemannite, klockmannite, berzelianite, umangite, gold, stibiopalladinite and uraninite.

It was first described in 1832 and named for the discovery locality of Clausthal-Zellerfeld in the Harz Mountains, Germany.

See also

 Classification of minerals
 List of minerals

References

Lead minerals
Selenide minerals
Galena group